Naorem is a Meetei surname. It is native to Ancient Kangleipak (Antique Manipur). People of this family mainly inhabit in Manipur, India.

History 
During the era of King Samuroiba Ningthou, the Naorem clan built a temple dedicated to God Khamlangba at Kakching Wairi. The holy shrine was looked after by the Naorem family.

Notable persons 

 Laininghan Naoriya Phulo (alias Naorem Phulo) - Cultural revivalist and philosopher

References 

Indian surnames
Pages with unreviewed translations